Valley of Decision is the third album by the Christian Reggae group Christafari, the second released on the Gotee label.

Track listing
All songs written by Mark Mohr and Johnny Guerrero.

"Valley of Decision"
"Can't Stop"
"Best Friend (Intro)"
"Best Friend"
"Dinghi (Interlude)"
"My Eyes"
"Modern Day Pharisee"
"Surrender"
"Set Me Free"
"Freedom Dub"
"Conquering Lion (Intro)"
"Jungle Inna Babylon"
"Keep On Looking Up"
"Live This Love"
"Big Dance (Interlude)"
"Time"
"Him Die Fi Yuh"
"No Puedo Dejar (Intro)"
"No Puedo Dejar (Can't Stop Spanish)"

Personnel
 Mark Mohr – Lead vocals, Raggamuffin chat, percussion, drum programming
 Erik Sven Sundin – Lead vocals
 Vanessa Mohr – Background vocals and dance
 Marky Rage – Keyboards, background vocals
 Bill Kasper – Lead and rhythm guitars
 Lyndon Barrington Allen – Bass, background vocals
 Ken Yarnes – Drums
 Johnny Guerrero – Saxophone (solo on track 8), keyboard bass (track 12), drums (track 17), horn arrangements, drum programming, background vocals

Additional musicians
 Rob Ray - Keyboards
 Sam Levine – Saxophone
 Douglas Maffet – Saxophone
 Barry Green – Trombone, trombone solo on track 13
 Chris Dunn – Trombone
 William Huber – Trombone
 Joey Ko – Trumpet, transcriptions, and additional arranging
 Tommy (Musa) Smith – Percussion on tracks 5 and 15
 Tim Akers - Drum programming
 Scott Blackwell - Drum programming, keyboards, keyboard bass on track 12
 Reid Waltz - Drum programming, background vocals
 Joe Freel - Background vocals
 Emily Sundin - Background vocals

Credits
 Reid Waltz - Recording
 Joe Baldridge - Mixing
 Scott Blackwell - Production, mixing on track 12
 Pete Martinez - Mixing assistant
 Randy Leroy - Mastering
 Kerri Stuart - Art direction
 Chuck Hargett - Layout design
 David Dobson - Photography
 Toby - Executive producer
 Joey - Executive producer
 Todd - Executive producer

References

1996 albums
Christafari albums
Gotee Records albums